Strank is a British surname. Notable people with the surname include:

Angela Strank (born 1952), British geologist
Michael Strank (1919–1945), United States Marine Corps sergeant

See also
 Stranks

Surnames of British Isles origin